June 2010

See also

References 

List of killings by law enforcement officers in the United States, 2010
2010 in the United States
 06
June 2010 events in the United States